Ildar Gilmutdinov is a deputy for the United Russia party in the 7th State Duma of the Russian Federation. He is the head of the committee for nationalities.

Chairman of the Council of the Federal National and Cultural Autonomy of the Tatars (since 2007).

Membership:

Council for interethnic relations under the President of the Russian Federation;

Board of the Ministry of Sports of the Republic of Tatarstan.

References

21st-century Russian politicians
Living people
United Russia politicians
Year of birth missing (living people)
Fourth convocation members of the State Duma (Russian Federation)
Fifth convocation members of the State Duma (Russian Federation)
Sixth convocation members of the State Duma (Russian Federation)
Seventh convocation members of the State Duma (Russian Federation)
Eighth convocation members of the State Duma (Russian Federation)